Cherington may refer to:

Places
Cherington, Gloucestershire in England
Cherington, Warwickshire in England

People
Ben Cherington (born 1974), American baseball executive
Fletcher B. Cherington (1850–1908), American Methodist reverend